The Journal of Clinical Microbiology is a monthly medical journal published by the American Society for Microbiology. The journal was established in 1975. The editor-in-chief is Alexander J. McAdam (Boston Children's Hospital). It is a delayed open access journal. Full text content is available free after a six-month embargo.

Abstracting and indexing
The journal is abstracted and indexed in:

According to the Journal Citation Reports, the journal has a 2021 impact factor of 11.677

See also
Clinical medicine
Clinical research
Medical microbiology

References

External links 

American Society for Microbiology

Delayed open access journals
Microbiology journals
Monthly journals
English-language journals
Publications established in 1975
Applied microbiology journals
American Society for Microbiology academic journals